The Naples Police Department is the police department for Naples, Florida.
Along with the regular patrol unit, police operations include sworn officers assigned to special assignments, including criminal investigations, traffic enforcement, marine patrol, a K-9 team, community policing, crime prevention and bicycle patrols. The Patrol Division consists of four uniform patrol squads who work 12-hour shifts. Each patrol squad consists of eight officers and one sergeant. Two of these squads comprise the day shift patrol operations which are complemented by various specialty units. The other two squads make up the night shift patrol operations which also includes a K-9 team. Each patrol shift has a support sergeant and a lieutenant who oversees the overall shift operations. The patrol division is assigned the task of responding to a variety of calls for service. Some examples of patrol division responsibilities include, conducting traffic enforcement to insure a safe and orderly flow of vehicular traffic, conducting traffic crash investigations, conducting preliminary criminal investigations, protecting crime and accident scenes, recognizing and collecting evidence of criminal activity, conducting search and rescue operations, initiating crime prevention efforts, promoting good community relations and enforcing state and local laws within the City of Naples jurisdiction.

See also
List of United States state and local law enforcement agencies
List of law enforcement agencies in Florida

References

External links
 Naples, FL - Official Website - Police

Municipal police departments of Florida
Naples, Florida